This article lists important figures and events in the public affairs of British Malaya during the year 1946, together with births and deaths of prominent Malayans. Malaya remained under British Military Administration until the establishment of the Malayan Union on 1 April.

Incumbent political figures

Central level 
 Governor of Malaya :
 Military Administration - (until 30 March)
 Edward Gent - (from 1 April)

State level
  Perlis :
 Raja of Perlis : Syed Harun Putra Jamalullail 
  Johore :
 Sultan of Johor : Sultan Ibrahim Al-Masyhur
  Kedah :
 Sultan of Kedah : Sultan Badlishah
  Kelantan :
 Sultan of Kelantan : Sultan Ibrahim
  Trengganu :
 Sultan of Trengganu : Sultan Ismail Nasiruddin Shah
  Selangor :
 Sultan of Selangor : Sultan Sir Hishamuddin Alam Shah Al-Haj 
  Penang :
 Monarchs : King George VI
 Residents-Commissioner :
 Thomas John Norman Hilken (until unknown date)
 Sydney Noel King (from unknown date)
  Malacca :
 Monarchs : King George VI
 Residents-Commissioner : Edward Victor Grace Day
  Negri Sembilan :
 Yang di-Pertuan Besar of Negri Sembilan : Tuanku Abdul Rahman ibni Almarhum Tuanku Muhammad 
   Pahang :
 Sultan of Pahang : Sultan Abu Bakar
  Perak :
 British Adviser of Perak : Arthur Vincent Aston (from unknown date)
 Sultan of Perak : Sultan Abdul Aziz Al-Mutasim Billah Shah

Events
16 January – A Chinese vegetable gardener named Foong Mok killed nine people in Boyan, a kampong near Taiping, Perak. He was subsequently sent to hospital for observation and found to be insane.
1 April – The Malayan Union was established, combining the Straits Settlements (except Singapore), Federated Malay States and Unfederated Malay States into a single entity, and replaced British Military Administration (BMA).
1 April – Civil Affairs Police Force (CAPF) was renamed the Malayan Union Police Force.
 1 April - Malayan Film Unit (MFU) was established.
 1 April - Radio Televisyen Malaysia (RTM) was established.
11 May – United Malays National Organisation (UMNO) was founded at Istana Besar, Johor Bahru, Johor. Dato Onn Jaafar became the first president.
August – Malayan Indian Congress (MIC) was founded by John A. Thivy.
1 September – Malayan Meteorological Service was established (changing its name to Malaysian Meteorological Service in 1965).
14 December – All-Malaya Council of Joint Action (AMCJA) was founded (dissolved in 1948).
 Unknown date – The Alice Smith School was founded. One of the oldest British international schools in Asia.
 Unknown date – The Kelantan Football Association was founded as Kelantan Amateur Football Association.

Births

Deaths

See also 
 1946
 1945 in Malaya | 1947 in Malaya
 History of Malaysia

References 

Years of the 20th century in Malaysia
Malaya
Malaya, 1946 In
Malaya
Malaya